Michael Turnbull may refer to:
 Michael Turnbull (bishop) (born 1935), Church of England bishop
 Michael Turnbull (soccer) (born 1981), Australian former professional footballer
 Michael G. Turnbull (born 1949), Canadian-born American architect

See also
 Michaela Turnbull, a fictional character from EastEnders